Simon is the second EP by American indie band Dirty Little Rabbits. The EP was recorded and produced at the Sound Farm Studio & Recording Environment in Jamaica, Iowa and was scheduled for release on January 20, 2009, however it was pushed back a week and released on January 27, 2009, through The End Records. Simon was the first release by the band which will be available to a much wider range of people, whereas their first EP; Breeding was available only through select music stores in the United States.

Track listing
 "Poor Poor Woman with Her Head in the Oven" - 4:03
 "You Say" - 3:23
 "Hello" - 4:12
 "I'm So Beautiful" - 3:51
 "Happy" - 3:29
 "Same Mistakes" - 3:26

Personnel
 Stella Katsoudas - vocals
 Ty Fyhrie - guitars
 Jeff Karnowski - bass
 Shawn Crahan - drums, producer, art direction, photography
 Michael Pfaff - keyboards
 Matt Sepanic - mixing, mastering, engineering
 AJ Mogis - mixing, engineering
 Doug Van Sloun - mastering
 "Tadpoll" - engineering
 Ryan Martin - engineering

References

Dirty Little Rabbits albums
2009 EPs